Sugarpills is the debut album from New Zealand electropop band Kids of 88 released 16 August 2010. Singles released off the album include "My House", "Just a Little Bit" and most recently "Downtown". It was nominated for Best Pop Album at the 2011 New Zealand Music Awards.

Reception

Scott Kara of The New Zealand Herald gave Sugarpills 4 out of 5 stars, calling it "good-time party music" and saying that "You'd have to be a prude, or a killjoy not to want Sugarpills banging away at your house."

Singles
"My House", the first single from Kids of 88 was first heard on a C4 television advertisement. The song peaked at number 3 on the RIANZ New Zealand Singles Chart and remained in the chart for 17 weeks.
"Just a Little Bit", the second single from Kids of 88 was first heard on a Glassons NZ television advertisement. The song peaked at number 11 on the RIANZ New Zealand Singles Chart and remained in the chart for 19 weeks.
"Downtown", the third single from Kids of 88 was first heard on radio station The Edge. The song has currently peaked at number 21 on the RIANZ New Zealand Singles Chart and is still currently in the chart.

Track listing

Release history

References

External links
 

2010 debut albums
Kids of 88 albums